Charles Heimsch (May 4, 1914 - April 23, 2003)  was an American botanist who specialized in systematic plant anatomy. He helped establish a doctoral program while chair of the Department of Botany at Miami University, a position which he held for 18 years. He served as editor-in-chief for the American Journal of Botany from 1964 to 1969, and was president of the Botanical Society of America from 1971 to 1972. 

He authored many scholarly articles on the subject of plant anatomy, and has published two textbooks.

Legacy
In 1994, Heimsch was inducted into the Miami University Athletic Hall of Fame as a standout football player. He played as both a quarterback and a linebacker/defensive back on the team coached by Frank Wilton.

The Charles Heimsch Conference Room in Pearson Hall at Miami University is named for him. The Charles Heimsch Graduate Award in Botany given out at Miami University is also named in his honor.

References

1914 births
2003 deaths
American botanists
People from Dayton, Ohio
Miami RedHawks football players
American football quarterbacks
Harvard University alumni
Swarthmore College faculty
Amherst College faculty
University of Texas at Austin faculty
Miami University faculty
Scientists from Ohio
Players of American football from Ohio